Nizami (Persian: نظامی) may refer to:

People
 Nizami (name)
 Nizami Ganjavi, Persian poet
 Nezami Aruzi, Persian author and poet

Places
 Nizami raion, a settlement and rayon in Baku, Azerbaijan
 Nizami, Goranboy, a village and municipality in the Goranboy Rayon of Azerbaijan
 Nizami, Sabirabad, a village and municipality in the Sabirabad Rayon of Azerbaijan
 Nizami Order, a Sufi order in Pakistan and India
 Nizami, Armenia, a village in the Ararat Province of Armenia
 Nezami, Iran, a village in Semnan Province, Iran

Other uses
 Nizami (opera)
 Dars-i-Nizami, an Islamic study curriculum used in South Asia
 3770 Nizami, an asteroid
 Nizami Museum of Azerbaijan Literature, in Baku, Azerbaijan
 Nizami Mausoleum, built in honor of Nizami Ganjavi in Ganja, Azerbaijan
 Nizami Gəncəvi (Baku Metro), built in honor of Nizami Ganjavi in Baku, Azerbaijan
 Nizami (Plural: Nizamis) - People who were serving Nizam of Hyderabad in various capacities
 Nizami (film)

See also
 Nizam (disambiguation)
 Nizam al-Din (disambiguation)